The 2003 Braintree District Council election took place on 1 May 2003 to elect members of Braintree District Council in England. This was on the same day as other local elections.

Summary

Candidates by party

Results

Ward results

Black Norley & Terling

Bocking Blackwater

Bocking North

Bocking South

Bradwell, Silver End & Rivenhall

Braintree Central

Braintree East

Braintree South

Bumpstead

Coggeshall & North Feering

Cressing & Stisted

Gosfield & Greenstead Green

Great Notley & Braintree West

Halstead St. Andrew's

Halstead Trinity

Hatfield Peverel

Headingham & Maplestead

Kelvedon

Panfield

Rayne

Stour Valley North

Stour Valley South

The Three Colnes

Three Fields

Upper Colne

Witham Chipping Hill & Central

Witham North

Witham South

Witham West

Yeldham

By-elections

Hedingham and Maplestead

Rayne

References

Braintree District Council elections
2003 English local elections
May 2003 events in the United Kingdom
2000s in Essex